Search space may refer to one of the following.

In optimization, the domain of the function to be optimized
In search algorithms of computer science, the feasible region defining the set of all possible solutions
In computational geometry, part of the input data in geometric search problems
Version space,  developed via machine learning, it is the subset of all hypotheses that are consistent with the observed training examples

See also 
 Space (disambiguation)